Iceland's first ambassador to East Germany was Oddur Guðjónsson in 1973. Iceland's last ambassador to East Germany was Hjálmar W. Hannesson in 1990.

List of ambassadors

See also
Germany–Iceland relations
Foreign relations of Iceland
Ambassadors of Iceland

References
List of Icelandic representatives (Icelandic Foreign Ministry website) 

1973 establishments in Europe
1990 disestablishments in Europe
Main
East Germany
Iceland